The Archives of the University of Glasgow (GUAS) maintain the historical records of the University of Glasgow back to its foundation in 1451.  Its earliest record is a charter dating from 1304 for the lands of the earliest mention of record-keeping in the university is in 1490 when it is recorded in the Annales Universitatis Glasguensis 1451–1558 that 'in accordance with a proposition of the Lord Rector, a parchment book is ordered to be procured, in which important writs, statutes, and lists of the university, are to be engrossed: and also a paper book, for recording judicial proceedings.’  The Clerk to the Faculty, and subsequently the Clerk of Senate, maintained the records of the university due to the continuing requirement to ensure that the privileges, rights, policies and finances of the university were kept in good order.

Overview 
The Clerk's Press is the oldest surviving piece of university furniture and was acquired in 1634 to hold such records.  In 1955 the first professional University Archivist was appointed and it is currently one of the largest archive services in Scotland outside the national archives in Edinburgh.

The University Archives also manages the Scottish Business Archives, a large internationally important collection of business records (over 500 individual collections) covering the whole of Scotland and beyond dating from the 18th century to the present.  These collections reflect the contribution and breadth of activity that Scotland's business, industry and enterprise has made past and present to the world economy.  The collections were inaugurated by Sydney Checkland, the first professor of Economic History, in 1959 and have been managed by the University Archives since 1975. The Scottish Business Archive is one of the largest collection of business archives in Europe.

Collections
 
The collections include those for the University of Glasgow's predecessor and affiliated bodies, such as Anderson's College of Medicine, Glasgow Veterinary College, Glasgow Dental Hospital & School, Queen Margaret College, Royal Scottish Academy of Music & Drama, St Andrews College of Education, St Mungo's College of Medicine, and Trinity College. There are large collections of photographs relating to University personnel and buildings and Scottish topography and plans of university buildings and land.

The collection of shipbuilding records, many held on behalf of the National Archives of Scotland, is unrivalled and includes those of John Brown of Clydebank, the builders of the Queen Elizabeth and Queen Mary, William Denny and Brothers of Dumbarton, Lithgows of Port Glasgow and Scotts of Greenock, the world's senior shipbuilder.  Also included are the records of important national and international companies such as North British Locomotive Co, the world's largest locomotive works in 1900; James Finlay & Sons, East India merchants; Gourock Ropeworks Co and their New Lanark Mills, now a world heritage site; J & P Coats, world dominant Paisley thread manufacturers; the House of Fraser department store group; Anchor Line, cruise and emigrant passenger shipping company; Ivory & Sime, Edinburgh investment trust managers; Babcock & Wilcox, boiler-makers; Lloyds TSB, Scotland; and the major Scottish brewing and distilling companies, such as Tennents and Scottish & Newcastle.

There are papers of individual and families of entrepreneurs like Viscount William Weir (1877–1959), Sir James Lithgow (1883–1952) and the Napier family including their shipping, automobile, and textile interests.
Talks and events are arranged each year based on the holdings of the Archives and of the Library aided by support from the Friends of Glasgow University Library.

Admission to the Archives is free and everyone, members of the university, visiting researchers and members of the public can use the collections.

There are two public searchrooms.  The main searchroom is on the 2nd floor of the building at 13 Thurso Street, up 4 flights of stairs (43 steps). There is level access throughout the 2nd floor, and 2 toilets just off the searchroom. A ground-level searchroom also operates in the Dumbarton Road building, with 2 toilets and a disabled toilet facility close to the searchroom.

References

External links 
Archives and Special Collections at the University of Glasgow
The University of Glasgow Story
Scottish brewing
University of Glasgow WWI Roll of Honour

1304 establishments in Scotland
University of Glasgow
Archives in Scotland